Petropedetes palmipes is a species of frog in the family Petropedetidae. It is known from a few localities in southwestern Cameroon, Equatorial Guinea, and western Gabon. Common name Efulen water frog has been coined for it.

Description
Adult males measure  and adult females  in snout–urostyle length. The body is robust. The snout is relatively more pointed than in other Petropedetes. The tympanum is very small and indistinct whereas the supratympanic fold is distinct. The fingers are slender and have typically T-shaped tips. The fingers have no webbing whereas the toes are fully webbed. The dorsum is uniformly dark green and black with some tiny pale spots. Adults can be glossy black and difficult to see among wet stones. The upper hinds limbs have faint crossbars. The throat is whitish or dark marbled.

The tadpoles are flat-bodied with large eyes and a long, pointed tail. They are grey, turning darker with age, but translucent ventrally.

Habitat and conservation
The eggs are clued to rocks outside water, although eggs and tadpoles have also been found submerged.

Petropedetes palmipes is a rare species that does not tolerate much modification of its forest habitat. It is, presumably, threatened by habitat loss caused by agriculture, logging and human settlements. It is found in the Monte Alen National Park in Equatorial Guinea and in the Crystal Mountains National Park in Gabon.

References 

palmipes
Frogs of Africa
Amphibians of Cameroon
Amphibians of Equatorial Guinea
Amphibians of Gabon
Amphibians described in 1905
Taxa named by George Albert Boulenger
Taxonomy articles created by Polbot